Four Upbuilding Discourses (1844) is the last of the Eighteen Upbuilding Discourses published during the years 1843–1844 by Søren Kierkegaard. He published three more discourses on "crucial situations in life" (Three Discourses on Imagined Occasions) in 1845, the situations being confession, marriage, and death. These three areas of life require a "decision made in time".

Overview 
The book is about making decisions. Søren Kierkegaard had to make some decision. He had to decide if he wanted to get married after having already made the "sacred pledge". He had to decide if he would carry out the wishes of his father, Michael, and become a Lutheran preacher or teacher. He made "negative" resolutions regarding these promises he had made. Perhaps some thought he should remain true to his word.

This word "resolution" is the core of Kierkegaard's idea behind the leap of faith. His question is: Who can make a positive or negative resolution for another? A resolution is best made by the single individual in the quietness of his or her soul through the inward struggle rather than the struggle with external forces.

This discourse has to do with a psychological view regarding the process of decision making and making of vows for "existing" single individuals and has nothing to do with the crowd or with "noisy voting".

Structure 
Søren Kierkegaard was born on May 5, 1813 and died on November 11, 1855. He kept a journal and he mentions a "Diary" in Either/Or and another in "Stages on Life's Way" with dates listed here and there. His preface to "Either/Or" says the following:"The Diary has a date here and there, but the year is always omitted. This might seem to preclude further inquiry, but by studying the individual dates, I believe I have found a clue. Of course every year has a seventh of April, a third of July, a second of August and so forth; but it is not true that the seventh of April falls every year on Monday. I therefore have made certain calculations and have found that this combination fits the year 1834." Either/Or, Part I, Preface, p. 10 Swenson Later, in Stages on Life's Way he wrote a "Morning" entry in the diary on May 4 about birth and on May 5 at "Midnight" an entry on Periander. Then on "June 18 at Midnight" he wrote about guilt. His mother Ane Kierkegaard was born on June 18. Then on July 7 at midnight he wrote about Regine. There is a genealogy of his family on the internet. He used dates in his discourses also.

 The Four Upbuilding Discourses begin with a Preface, Kierkegaard had just published a book called Prefaces on Jun 17, 1844 and now he's publishing these discourses on August 31, 1844. He had published a preface for his Two Upbuilding Discourses and dated it May 5, 1843, his birthday, for which he gives God thanks for another year in which he can have "his spirit tested". He later dated the Preface to his Lilies of the Field and The Birds of the Air May 5, 1849. Is he placing markers to show the slow but steady process of his own conversion to Christianity?

The preface for this, his last discourses published in this two-year period, was dated August 9, 1844, the date of or after the death of his father, Mikael Pedersen Kierkegaard, (August 9, 1838). It could be possible that these Eighteen Upbuilding Discourses was his way of getting over the loss of his father and his mother, Ane Sørensdatter Lund Kierkegaard, and brothers and sisters too. Soren lost all of his brothers and sisters (Nicholene, Niels, Petrea, Soren Michael, Marin Kristine), as well as his mother and father by August 9, 1838. Only his brother Peter Christian was left. Soren died November 11, 1855 and Peter on February 24, 1888). Perhaps it was his way of grieving. But it's not grieving in a spectacular way. It's grieving as indirectly as possible. And doing it in a thoroughly Christian way by honoring his father and mother even though they were both dead. He wrote about death in his 1845 book Thoughts on Crucial Situations in Human Life, which was translated by David F. Swenson in 1941 and also translated by Howard V. Hong and Edna H. Hong as Three Discourses on Imagined Occasions in 1993. He wrote: 

He kept to his familiar formula while writing his preface by dedicating his discourse to his father, who was a clothing merchant living in Copenhagen and writing to my reader, not my readers, because his books were for each single individual to read if she or he wanted to read it. His preface said, in part, "although this little book (which is called “discourses,” not sermons, because its author does not have authority to preach, “upbuilding” discourses, not discourses for upbuilding, because the speaker by no means claims to be a teacher) is once again going out into the world, it is even less fearful of drawing any impeding attention to itself than it was the first time it started on the journey; it hopes rather that because of the repetition the passersby will scarcely notice it, or if at all only to let it shift for itself.  It seeks that single individual whom I with joy and gratitude call my reader, in order to pay him a visit, indeed, to stay with him, because one goes to the person one loves, makes one’s home with him, and remains with him if this is allowed." Søren Kierkegaard, Eighteen Upbuilding Discourses, Hong p. 295 

The discourses are titled,
To Need God Is a Human Being's Highest Perfection
The Thorn in the Flesh
Against Cowardliness
One Who Prays Aright Struggles in Prayer and Is Victorious—in That God Is Victorious

To Need God Is a Human Being's Highest Perfection
Kierkegaard "felt inclined to doubt a little the correctness of the familiar philosophic maxim that the external is the internal and the internal the external and was always heretically-minded on this point in philosophy." The external would be experience and the internal revelation.  This developed into the discussions about the primacy of Revelation or of Reason in religious matters. At this time a new medium for knowledge was coming of age, newspapers. Kierkegaard wrote about them on November 28, 1835. These newspapers came to be regarded as another form of knowledge. But is this knowledge given by the newspapers an external or an internal form of knowledge or of revelation? Kierkegaard wondered about that.

He many times referred to "the one thing needful" throughout his writings. Now he says "to need God is a human being's highest perfection." This is direct communication instead of the indirect method he chose for most of his pseudonymous writings. He has discussed the goods of the world in comparison to the goods of the spirit which indicates the same external and internal relationship. This fragment of the Bible, "one thing needful", is found in the story of Martha of Bethany and Mary Magdalene from the New Testament. Mary knew she was a sinner and thanked Christ for saving her from her sins, while Martha was busy serving Him. Martha said, “Lord, do you not care that my sister has left me to serve alone? Tell her then to help me.”  But the Lord answered her, “Martha, Martha, you are anxious and troubled about many things; one thing is needful. Mary has chosen the good portion, which shall not be taken away from her.” Mary represents the one who is related to Christ in an internal way and Martha the external. Speculation might say that Mary is William Blake or Johann Goethe and Martha is Georg Wilhelm Friedrich Hegel or Baruch Spinoza. Kierkegaard uses these single individuals to help him "teach his age what it is 'to become a Christian'." Can a single individual be seduced by the religious in such a way that he or she becomes in danger of developing into extreme examples of the internal (mystic) and the external (Don Quixote)?
What, then, was the one thing ' that he willed? As he makes clear in Om min Forfatter- Virksomhed (My Literary Activity 1851, p. 35ff), it was religion; or, more definitely, his one aim was to teach his age what it is ' to become a Christian' or at least "compel the age to take notice." He discussed this further in his 1848 unpublished book, The Point of View For my Work as an Author, where he discusses a factum that made him into a poet and his esthetic production moved him forward to a different place. He wrote:

Kierkegaard goes on to tell "the secret of perfection: that to need God is nothing to be ashamed of but is perfection itself." Another way to say that is we become perfect when we learn that we are not perfect. Once that happens the individual struggles with himself rather than with the world. He uses Moses as an example of an individual who knew he was capable of nothing at all but he was confronted by the crowd that demanded a demonstration. He sums up this battle for the self this way:

The outer world is constantly in a state of flux but if a single individual wants to be able to function in such a world he or she must be able to allow the change but stay constant in the inner being through a strengthening process. Kierkegaard believed the world of the spirit is opposed to the world of change because God never changes. And God strengthens in the inner being before asking for external action. Then "when the first self submits to the deeper self, they are reconciled and walk on together." (Edifying Discourses, p. 253ff) Arthur Schopenhauer thought differently than Kierkegaard on this point.

The Thorn in the Flesh
Kierkegaard discusses other Biblical phrases that have been turned into speculative enterprises for scholars as well as lay ministers. Here he discusses "the thorn in the flesh" and "caught up in the third heaven." The Apostle Paul had experience and an assured spirit yet he had this thorn in the side and the order not to discuss being caught up in the third heaven. This unsettled Paul, since he wanted to know all things, and had conflict in his soul. Kierkegaard writes elegantly about Paul's search for peace. 

Those who interpret the Bible can do harm to the single individual who is reading the interpretation because of the way that an individual is constituted. Paul learned he would not be able to know everything and said it was beneficial for him that this is the way it is. Kierkegaard says, "he had experienced the beatitude of heaven and had kept the pledge of the spirit, but there was nevertheless a memory. And a memory is difficult to manage. At one time it is far away, and then, presto, it is right there as if it had never been forgotten. Paul had memories of stoning Stephen and persecuting Christians and wandered about in "the fog of unintelligibility."

His intent was exemplified in his 1846 book, Concluding Unscientific Postscript: 

Kierkegaard challenges the reader with the question, "Do you know what the discourse is about?" Paul had been given Roman citizenship as a gift from God, he had been given this challenge of trying to guide an infant church into existence along with others chosen by Christ. What do we do about the positive gifts we have been given by God? These gifts become thorns if you don't use them. Martin Luther had commented about thorns much in the same way Kierkegaard does here when he wrote to his wife, "Thou mayest tell M. Philipps to correct his postil. He never understood why our Lord, in the gospel, calls riches thorns. Here is the school to learn that. But I shudder to think that thorns, in the Scripture, are always threatened with fire. Wherefore I have the greater patience, if haply, by the help of God, I may be able to bring some good to pass." (Martin Luther, To His Wife 1546)  Kierkegaard was grateful for the free gift of intellectual ability, imagination, and dialectical skills and he took these gifts as gifts that should be used in the service of God. Is it better to examine your own positive qualities or the negative qualities associated to your own self? Can knowledge become a thorn in the side? Here is how he said it in 1847 and then 1848,

Against Cowardliness
Kierkegaard begins with a passage from the Bible in this discourse, "For God did not give us a spirit of timidity but a spirit of power and love and self-control." 2 Timothy 1:7.  Kierkegaard returns to the subject of Either/Or and writes in "praise of the resolution". The decision to make a resolution is the leap of faith because the resolution always leads the person forward. Scholars can interpret this passage and write whole books about it but it seems that there would be "an abundance of interpretations and a poverty of action."

His discourse is against cowardliness not against pride because the single individual aught to be able to "acknowledge the good that he does do". But the single individual evades action by using cowardliness and time. He says the spirit enters into the service of the good so it can build a tower to the Lord. But cowardliness gets in the way. What is cowardliness and does everyone possess it or is it only possessed by the weak and anxious? Kierkegaard answers in this way, "take it for granted that everyone is somewhat cowardly, and in particular it can safely be assumed that anyone who seeks to know himself better will be willing to acknowledge that he has not infrequently caught himself in it, and for that reason he is always a bit dubious about even his boldest enterprise." So remember "the one thing needful".

The single individual can know very many things but not do much of anything that relates to the knowing. One can reflect on what the Bible says or one could decide to do something in relation to what they know. Kierkegaard put it this way in his Concluding Postscript (1846) and again in his journals. 

Kierkegaard wanted to get married but he took his time about making his decision, even after he had made a promise to marry. He consulted with himself and with God and made a negative resolution about marriage. But someone might come along in the future. He learned not to lean on an imagined view of what a woman is through his contact with Regine Olsen and didn't form an opinion of what he wanted. He didn't want to compare girl with girl and find out through comparison that his tower was higher or lower than others. 

The rest of the discourse discusses how cowardliness, false pride, sagacity, and time conspire to keep us out of the world of the spirit and from acting there. But he keeps reminding every single individual that all are equal in the world of the spirit. Kierkegaard preferred to study the Bible alone so he could have a clear understanding of where he stood. Others can't do that and need help or to hear it read aloud in Church. Kierkegaard had to make his own resolution about the world of the spirit. He wrote the following in 1848. "I had to either cast myself into perdition and sensuality, or to choose the religious absolutely as the one thing-either the world in a measure that would be dreadful, or the cloister." In this resolution he maintained, as the apostles had, that he was only an "unworthy servant". He strove to keep his resolution and asked others the following question. "Where does the fault lie if the person and his resolution no longer live together in harmony?"

One Who Prays Aright Struggles in Prayer and Is Victorious—in That God Is Victorious
Now Kierkegaard takes the reader where he wanted to take him. To prayer, specifically to the "struggle" involved in prayer. And the prayer hopes for the "reward". Is to struggle in prayer a "contradiction" in terms? Can it be shown artistically and scientifically? It all gets confused and "the strong man is warned not to misuse his power against the weak, but the weak man is also warned not to misuse the power of prayer against the strong." Every single individual prays in his or her own particular way and there is no "scientific method" for praying. But what are we praying about?  

Many Christians as well as individuals associated with other religious bodies pray. It seems to be something everyone does. All struggle but Kierkegaard asks, "But what is the issue in the struggle?" Is it the outcome or result that is the issue? What happens if the praying individual becomes "lukewarm and cold and indifferent"? He says, "One says: To renounce everything is an enormous abstraction-that is why one must proceed to hold on to something. But if the task is to renounce everything, what if one began by renouncing something?"

He's been discussing the relationship of human being to human being, the relationship of a human being with the soul, and a human being in relationship with God. And he's been discussing change. One human being can change another but it can cause many difficulties. The human being who is aware that a soul exists within the inner being can consider it as an individual. "Worship is the maximum for a human being’s relationship with God, and thereby for his likeness to God, since the qualities are absolutely different."

 So we pray to God about what we want and need. Kierkegaard's first discourse says this about needs, "MAN wants but little here below, nor wants that little long" is a high-minded saying, well worthy of acceptance, and worthy also of being accepted as it desires to be accepted. Let us then take it away from him: wealth and power and influence, and the deceitful service of false friendship, and the obedient subjection of his pleasures to the whim of his desires, and the triumphs of his vanity over the admiration of his worshipers, and the flattering attention of the throngs, and the envied magnificence of his entire presence. Now he has lost it, and is content with less. Just as the world cannot recognize him on account of the great alteration in his circumstances, so he finds it hard to recognize himself— so changed is he: that he who once needed so much now needs so little." Edifying Discourses, a selection, Swenson p. 136-138

How does the crowd decide what it wants and needs compared with the decision of the single individual? The crowd hears stories and wonders if they are true. Repetition of the story increases its validity. Kierkegaard thinks people should reflect on those stories for a longer period of time and choose for themselves if they are believable. He wrote the following in 1846: 

Søren Kierkegaard made many wishes in his life and had them "die in being born". He also hoped much but started out with "a short-lived hope, that tomorrow is forgotten; a childish hope, that old age does not recognize". He was just a young man and young men like to wish and hope and love. He found that his "faith was disappointed and vanished because of the pain of the wish". He wished for happiness and good health and to have money and the possibility of a family; and he wanted to know what he needed for his wish to come true. He hoped that somehow the conditions would be right so he could be happy. That's all he wanted.

When he was young he complained to the Greek gods Prometheus and Epimetheus because they equipped human beings so gloriously and yet it did not occur to them to give them money also. Here he was the ethicist like Martha. What service she could have done if she only had the money. Earlier, as the esthete, he had asked for an internal good, a sense of humor. Mary knew she was a sinner, that she was unethical and yet she was saved. Imagine what Mary could have done with a sense of humor. One could make prayer an external, scientific act while the other could make it into a suffocating internal private act with no other communication. But neither way, if taken to extremes, would result in faith. He visits this theme again in 1850 with his discourse The Woman Who Was a Sinner where he says, "from a woman you learn concern for the one thing needful, from Mary, sister of Lazarus, who sat silent at Christ's feet with her heart's choice: the one thing needful."
  
Kierkegaard said he could describe the movements of faith but he couldn't make them because he couldn't understand Abraham. It's difficult to understand each other in the physical world. Sometimes it's a miracle. Isn't it much more difficult to understand each other in the world of the spirit, because each single individual in a group of people praying is standing before God? And the secret given through prayer by God is a gift for the individual concerned according to Kierkegaard's view of the Bible.

Reception 
Kierkegaard was noticed by The Western Literary Messenger, Sept 1849, which wrote that everything exists for Kierkegaard in this one point, the human heart and as he reflects this changing heart in the eternal unchangeable, in that which became flesh and dwelt among us he has found a lively group of readers among the ladies.

In 1848, Kierkegaard wrote:  "I almost never made a visit, and at home the rule was strictly observed to receive no one except the poor who came to seek help." One could speculate that each time a poor single individual came to his door his first self shouted "Me wants" regarding the money he gave away. This corresponds with what Andrew Hamilton, a member of the Royal Society of Antiquaries of the North, Copenhagen, wrote about Søren Kierkegaard in 1852 in his book Sixteen Months in the Danish Isles (1852). Kierkegaard did his research among the living in the streets of Copenhagen during the day and among the dead in books during the evening hours. This author does not mention the discourses he wrote from 1843 to 1844. Yet his discourses always seem to finally meet that single individual whom he with joy and gratitude called his reader, sometimes in the second, third or fourth hour. The reader who takes with the right hand what was offered with the right hand and takes an interest in the seeker. This reader transforms the discourse into a conversation even though many will scarcely notice the discourses because of the repetition. 

The year Kierkegaard died, 1855, The Journal, Evangelical Christendom published a work entitled, Christian Work and the News of the Churches which stated that Kierkegaard wrote against the use of the arts and sciences in religion. Hans Lassen Martensen wrote about Kierkegaard's ideas in his book, Christian Ethics, and said Kierkegaard claimed himself as the inventor of the category of the "single individual" and saw only Socrates as his predecessor. But Kierkegaard may have been reacting to Johann Gottlieb Fichte's (1762 - 1814) category of the race over the individual in his lecture, Idea of Universal History, or of his discussion of pure Ego and Non Ego in his 1794 book The Vocation of the Scholar or even of Johann Goethe's view of Shakespeare as the self-made man, or possibly of George Brandes account of Ludwig Tieck's (1773 - 1853) poem Love/I in his Main Currents of Nineteenth Century Literature, Volume 2. But Kierkegaard was most interested in finding a way to get along with himself.

Kierkegaard and Friedrich Nietzsche (1844–1900) both rebelled against Hegel's philosophy. Neither had a systematic approach to philosophy or religion. And both were compared to Johann Georg Hamann (1730–1788), the "Magus of the North". Kierkegaard lived at the time Hegel was writing but Nietzsche had help with his battle because of the work of Arthur Schopenhauer (1788–1860). Both were identified with this category of the single individual.

David F. Swenson translated the Edifying Discourses during 1944–1945. The publisher (Augsburg Publishing House) said, "no real understanding of Kierkegaard is possible unless these devotional works are understood and assimilated." He wrote about Kierkegaard's idea of the inner and outer self in 1941. He agrees with Kierkegaard in that this "first self" must learn that it is not infallible and come to an agreement with the "deeper self" before growth can occur.

Existential philosophers have the category of the other which was an entity outside of the single individual. This "other" is something one is to be freed from because it wants to enslave the single individual wishing to remain a single individual in the face of the other. Kierkegaard would disagree with this interpretation and would insist that the other is the anxiety created by the interplay of the first self and the deeper self as it relates itself to the external world. He wrote the following in The Concept of Anxiety, which was published just two months before this final discourse of 1844. 

Howard V. Hong who translated the Upbuilding Discourses in 1990 said the following in his introduction to the book. "The movement is to arrive at the simple, the movement is from the public to the single individual." Kierkegaard tried to sell his discourses individually, then as Eighteen Upbuilding Discourses, published in 1845. After he ran out of his Two Upbuilding Discourses, 1843 he combined them into a set of sixteen which he called Sexten opbyggelige Taler. Sales were meager nonetheless. But he kept his faith in what he was called to do and continued writing.

Criticism 
Critics have been against putting so much stress on the inner life of the spiritual self at the expense of the outer life of the physical self. Kierkegaard would agree that a balance is necessary for one to be happy. George Brandes said in his memoirs (1906), "That God had died for me as my Saviour,—I could not understand what it meant." As far as Kierkegaard was concerned he would say Brandes was making a good start at becoming a Christian. Brandes also introduced Friedrich Nietzsche who was also interested in the problems of faith and knowledge and the idea that "
one thing is needful". Nietzsche wrote the following in his book, Beyond Good and Evil: 

Critics have concentrated on the personality of Kierkegaard to a greater degree than on his writings, especially his discourses. Early interpreters of his works were Georg Brandes, Harald Hoffding and O. P. Monrad according to this article written in 1915. 

Thomas Merton wrote a book in 1955 called No Man Is An Island in response to the interest scholars had in the category of the single individual because he thought this idea would lead people away from the Church. He writes very similarly to what Kierkegaard stated. Here is part of his prologue. 

Rollo May discussed Kierkegaard's ideal of creating oneself in his 1975 book, The Courage to Create. He agrees with Kierkegaard's assessment that the self is always only in the process of becoming that which it will be. Determinism, or the accidents of life, are what they are, but the thinking and self-creating that goes on with each single individual is what allows each of us to face our own fantasies.

Ib Ostenfeld argued that Kierkegaard must have been a "healthy and stable individual" once his personal psychology is considered.  He noted that "at the outset psychiatry was not a medical specialty in Denmark until the period 1880 to 1890 and that psychiatric studies of Kierkegaard are themselves quite recent. Indeed, the first author to study Kierkegaard from a medical point of views was P.A. Heiberg, who was himself a physician." (Author's Introduction). See link in Secondary sources for his 1978 book, Søren Kierkegaard's Psychology.

Kierkegaard used the Bible as a source book. Jon Stewart has written two books about Kierkegaard's use of the Bible in his works. The Dictionary of Major Biblical Interpreters states, "The Bible was the most important piece of literature in Søren Kierkegaard's life."

There is this tension between those who want to go it alone and those who want company along the way. Kierkegaard was concerned about those who want to teach themselves everything and those who can barely teach themselves anything. If they want to argue with one another then there should be no "scorn and contempt and ways of frightening". One ought to help the other. He wrote about egotistical and sympathetic depression, autopathetic doubt, autopathetic and sympathetic resolutions, and suffering autopathetically and sympathetically. Some things have to be done alone but that doesn't apply to all things. He liked to pray and this discourse was about prayer. He wrote the following prayer in Practice in Christianity (1850), a book for "awakening and deepening."

References

Sources

Primary sources
Man's Need of God Constitutes His Highest Perfection Søren Kierkegaard, Four Upbuilding Discourses, 1844  first discourse of the series. Translated by David F. Swenson 1944-45, 1958
Four Upbuilding Discourses, 1844 Wikiquote
Eighteen Upbuilding Discourses, Hong 1990

Secondary sources
The Western Literary Messenger, Sept 1849 Living Philosophers in Denmark
Sixteen Months in the Danish Isles,  by Andrew Hamilton (antiquary) 1852
Evangelical Christendom, ed. (1856). "The Doctrines of Dr Kierkegaard,"
Hans Lassen Martensen (1871). "Christian ethics : (General part)
Nietzsche, Frederich, and His Influence, The Book-Lover. Published 1900 p. 144ff
George Brandes, Reminiscences of My Childhood and Youth, 1906
Encyclopaedia of religion and ethics Vol 7 (1908) p. 696ff
Soren Kierkegaard Encyclopædia of Religion and Ethics, Volume VII,  James Hastings, John Alexander Selbie, Louis Herbert Gray, published by T. & T. Clark, 1915 p. 696-700
Paul Tillich, The Courage to Be, 1952 This book also discusses Kierkegaard in relation to becoming.
Thomas Merton, No Man Is an Island 1955
Rollo May, The Courage to Create, 1974, 1994 (Google Books) 
 Ib Ostenfeld, Alastair McKinnon, Søren Kierkegaard's Psychology 1978 (Google Books)
Lorraine Clark Blake, Kierkegaard, and the Spectre of the Dialectic, Trent University 1991, Cambridge University Press

External links
 
 Martin Luther YouTube - Kierkegaard may have been thinking of Luther in his writings
 The Life of Georg Wilhelm Friedrich Hegel by J. Loewenberg from The German Classics of the Nineteenth and Twentieth Centuries by Kuno Francke, 1913-1914 
 The Thorn in the Flesh by Lev Shestov 
  by F.W.J. Schelling
 Paul Tillich, The New Being Chapter 20: Our Ultimate Concern —this is an article about Martha and Mary
 Gergory B. Sadler,  Existentialism: Lev Shestov, All Things are Possible (Part 1) YouTube

1844 books
Books by Søren Kierkegaard
Christian literature
Ethics literature
Psychology books
19th-century Christian texts